Madame X (Greek title I Agnostos) is a 1954 Greek drama film directed by Orestis Laskos. It is based on the 1908 play Madame X by French playwright Alexandre Bisson (1848-1912).

Plot
A woman is thrown out of her home by her jealous husband and sinks into depravity. Twenty years later, she finds herself accused of murder for saving her son, who does not know who she is. He finds himself defending her without knowing her background.

Cast
 Cybele as Lina Flerianos (as Madame Cybele)
 Vana Filippidou as Young Lina
 Giorgos Pappas as Peter Flerianos
 Alekos Alexandrakis as Alkis Flerianos
 Nikos Pilavios as Young Alkis Flerianos
 Lambros Konstantaras as Steven Petrides
 Mimis Fotopoulos as Dimitrakis
 Christos Efthimiou as Manolakis
 Periklis Christoforidis as Lambros
 Gikas Biniaris as Yiannis
 Kyveli Theohari as Eftichia
 Eleni Zafeiriou as Rose, the housekeeper
 Boubouca as Dancer
 Mayia Melayia as Singer

See also
 Madame X
 List of Greek films

External links

1954 films
1950s Greek-language films
1954 drama films
Greek black-and-white films
Films directed by Orestis Laskos
Greek films based on plays
Greek drama films